Patricia Serneels (born 6 June 1965) is a former synchronized swimmer from Belgium.

References 

1965 births
Living people
Belgian synchronized swimmers
Olympic synchronized swimmers of Belgium
Synchronized swimmers at the 1984 Summer Olympics
Synchronized swimmers at the 1988 Summer Olympics
People from Wilrijk
Swimmers from Antwerp